Cytotechnology is the microscopic interpretation of cells to detect cancer and other abnormalities.  This includes the examination of samples collected from the uterine cervix (Pap test), lung, gastrointestinal tract or body cavities.

A cytotechnologist is an allied health professional trained to evaluate specimens on glass slides using microscopes. In some laboratories, a computer performs an initial evaluation, pointing out areas that may be of particular interest for later examination. In many laboratories, cytotechnologists perform the initial evaluation.  The cytotechnologist performs a secondary evaluation and determines whether a specimen is normal or abnormal. Abnormal specimens are referred to a pathologist for final interpretation or medical diagnosis.

Different countries have different certification requirements and standards for cytotechnologists.  In the United States there are currently two routes for certification: a person can first earn a bachelor's degree and then attend an accredited program in cytotechnology for 1 year, or they can attend a cytotechnology program that also awards a bachelor's degree. After successful completion of either route the individual becomes eligible to take a certification exam offered by the American Society for Clinical Pathology. People who complete the requirements and pass the examination are entitled to designate themselves as "CT (ASCP)".  The American Society for Cytotechnology (ASCT) sets U.S. professional standards, monitors legislative and regulatory issues, and provides education. Individual states regulate the licensure of cytotechnologists, usually following American Society of Cytopathology (ASC) guidelines.  

The ASC is for cytopathologists but certain qualified cytotechnologists can join it as well.

See also

Gynaecologic cytology
Cytopathology

References

External links
American Society for Cytotechnology website

Pathology